Remse is a municipality in the district of Zwickau in Saxony in Germany. Remse is located 2 miles north of Glauchau. Two federal highway cross the municipality. Besides that the federal Autobahn A4 is accessible from south of town.

Neighborhood Communities 
Neighborhood municipalities are Oberwiera and Schönberg as well as Meerane, Glauchau and Waldenburg.

References 

Zwickau (district)